The Kievskiye Vedomosti is a local daily Russian-language newspaper, based in Kyiv.  It is published in a tabloid format.  Its chief editor, Viktor Chayka, was affiliated with the Narodnyy Rukh Ukrainy party, but was expelled after the Kievskiye Vedomosti took an independent line, and criticised selected Rukh members.  In the late 1990s, two of the correspondents for Kievskiye Vedomosti were killed in connection with a government investigation into journalism .
Kievskiye Vedomosti is a member of UAPP.

External links 
 Kievskiye Vedomosti online

Publications established in 1992
Russian-language newspapers published in Ukraine
Mass media in Kyiv
Daily newspapers published in Ukraine